Fabiano Soares Pessoa (born 10 June 1966), known simply as Fabiano, is a Brazilian football manager and former player.

An attacking midfielder, Fabiano's professional career was mostly associated with Compostela, as both a player and manager. During 11 seasons, he played 361 competitive matches for the club and scored 46 goals.

In 2006, Fabiano started working as a coach.

Playing career

Celta
Born in Rio de Janeiro, Fabiano represented Botafogo, Cruzeiro and São José-SP. In 1989, immediately after having finished runner-up in the Campeonato Paulista with the latter club and suffered the loss of his father, he moved to Spain where he would remain for the following 15 years, starting off at RC Celta de Vigo.

Fabiano made his La Liga debut on 17 September 1989, coming on as a late substitute in a 0–2 away loss against Athletic Bilbao. He scored his first goal in the Spanish top flight on 14 January 1990, contributing to a 5–1 home win over Cádiz CF as the season ended in relegation.

Compostela
In 1992, after two additional campaigns in Segunda División, Fabiano signed with neighbouring SD Compostela also in that level. He helped to a first-ever promotion for the Galicians in 1994 and, over the course of the following four seasons, was a midfield mainstay, notably netting in consecutive home draws against Real Madrid (1–1 on 2 April 1995, and 3–3 on 25 February 1996) and contributing with one goal in a 6–2 away routing of Deportivo de La Coruña for the local derby in May 1998.

At the end of 2002–03, Compos was relegated to Segunda División B for financial irregularities. Fabiano subsequently left and joined another team in that region, Racing de Ferrol, retiring at the end of the season at the age of 38.

Coaching career
Soares started working as a coach in 2006, with former club Compostela in the regional leagues. From 2008 to 2011 he was in charge of amateurs Bergantiños FC, Compostela again – taking the reins of the team at the end of the ninth round, he eventually failed to prevent relegation from division three, as dead last– and CD Estradense.

In summer 2011, Soares was appointed assistant coach at G.D. Estoril Praia from Portugal, going on to work under several managers including compatriot Vinícius Eutrópio and Marco Silva. In March 2015, following José Couceiro's departure, both he and former club player Hugo Leal took the reins until the end of the season, eventually leading the team to the 12th position in the Primeira Liga; in July, he was appointed the sole head coach.

On 11 December 2016, after only 15 points in 13 matches during the campaign, Soares was relieved of his duties. The following 11 July, he returned to his home country after being named Atlético Paranaense manager; he was sacked on 4 December, with his side having finished in 11th position.

In January 2019, Soares was hired at K League 2 title favourites Jeonnam Dragons. He was dismissed in July, with the team third from bottom.

In April 2021, Fabiano was appointed in charge of Barra-SC, but left the club on a mutual agreement on 17 June, two weeks before the start of the Campeonato Catarinense Série B. On 26 April 2022, he was named at the helm of Campeonato Brasileiro Série C side Vitória, but was sacked on 19 June.

References

External links

1966 births
Living people
Footballers from Rio de Janeiro (city)
Brazilian footballers
Association football midfielders
Campeonato Brasileiro Série A players
Botafogo de Futebol e Regatas players
Cruzeiro Esporte Clube players
São José Esporte Clube players
La Liga players
Segunda División players
Segunda División B players
RC Celta de Vigo players
SD Compostela footballers
Racing de Ferrol footballers
Brazilian expatriate footballers
Expatriate footballers in Spain
Brazilian expatriate sportspeople in Spain
Brazilian football managers
SD Compostela managers
Primeira Liga managers
G.D. Estoril Praia managers
Campeonato Brasileiro Série A managers
Club Athletico Paranaense managers
Jeonnam Dragons managers
Esporte Clube Vitória managers
Brazilian expatriate football managers
Expatriate football managers in Spain
Expatriate football managers in Portugal
Expatriate football managers in South Korea